Stenodrillia is a genus of sea snails, marine gastropod mollusks in the family Drilliidae.

Fossil records
This genus is known in the fossil records from the Oligocene to the Pliocene (age range: from 28.4 to 2.588 million years ago). Fossils are found in the marine strata of Italy, 
Austria, Denmark and Hungary.

Description

Species
Species within the genus Stenodrillia include:
 † Stenodrillia bellardii Des Moulins 1842 
 Stenodrillia horrenda (Watson, 1886)
 † Stenodrillia obeliscus Desmoulins 1842 
Species brought into synonymy
 Stenodrillia acestra (Dall, 1889): synonym of Compsodrillia acestra (Dall, 1889)
 Stenodrillia eucosmia (Dall, 1889): synonym of Compsodrillia eucosmia (Dall, 1889)
 Stenodrillia gundlachi (Dall & Simpson, 1901): synonym of Compsodrillia gundlachi (Dall & Simpson, 1901)
 Stenodrillia haliostrephis (Dall, 1889): synonym of Compsodrillia haliostrephis (Dall, 1889)

References

 Des Moulins, Charles. Révision de quelques espèces de pleurotomes... chez Th. Lafargue, libraire, 1842.
 Rosenberg, G., F. Moretzsohn, and E. F. García. 2009. Gastropoda (Mollusca) of the Gulf of Mexico, Pp. 579–699 in Felder, D.L. and D.K. Camp (eds.), Gulf of Mexico–Origins, Waters, and Biota. Biodiversity. Texas A&M Press, College Station, Texas

External links
 WMSD

 
Drilliidae